The Ranger Mountains are a mountain range in Clark County, Nevada.

References 

Mountain ranges of Clark County, Nevada
Mountain ranges of Nevada